Hurricane Eugene may refer to:

 Tropical Storm Eugene (1981) – a weak storm that did not affect land
 Hurricane Eugene (1987) – Category 2 storm that made landfall south of Manzanillo, Mexico; caused heavy flooding and loss of power for Mexican coastal region
 Hurricane Eugene (1993) – Category 3 storm that made landfall on the Big Island of Hawaii as a tropical depression
 Hurricane Eugene (1999) – Category 2 storm that remained at sea, passing well south of Hawaii
 Tropical Storm Eugene (2005) – briefly threatened Baja California Sur, but remained at sea
 Hurricane Eugene (2011) – reached Category 4 intensity, but was no threat to land
 Hurricane Eugene (2017) – Category 3 storm that remained at sea

See also 

 Blizzard Eugene

Pacific hurricane set index articles